Senegalia ankokib is a species of plant in the family Fabaceae. It is found only in Somalia.

References

ankokib
Near threatened plants
Endemic flora of Somalia
Taxonomy articles created by Polbot